Ivan Kováč (25 December 1948 – 11 February 2023) was a Slovak middle-distance runner, specializing in 1,500 meters run, and sports journalist.

Biography 
Kováč was born in Zemianske Kostoľany on 25 December 1948. He originally started competing in athletics in Banská Štiavnica before moving to Dukla Banská Bystrica. 

Following his retirement, Kováč became a well-known radio sports commentator, covering football and ice hockey in addition to athletics.

Achievements 
Kováč was a part of the winning team in the relay 4 x 4 laps at the 1973 European Athletics Indoor Championships in Rotterdam. He also competed at the European Athletics Indoor Championships in 1970 in Vienna, 1971 in Sofia and 1974 in Rome as well as the 1973 Summer Universiade in Moscow.

On 30 May 1974, Kováč achieved the time of 3:39.4 in 1,500 meter run at an event in Bratislava, which is as of February 2023 still a national record in Slovakia.

References

External links 
 

1948 births
2023 deaths
People from Prievidza District
Sportspeople from the Trenčín Region
Slovak male middle-distance runners